The U.S. state of Missouri first required its residents to register their motor vehicles in 1907. Registrants provided their own license plates for display until 1911, when the state began to issue plates.

, plates are manufactured at the Jefferson City Correctional Center and are issued by the Missouri Department of Revenue. Front and rear plates are required for most classes of vehicles, while only rear plates are required for motorcycles and trailers.

Passenger baseplates

1911 to 1948

1949 to 1966
The 1955 (dated 1956) issue was the first Missouri license plate that complied with these standards.

1967 to 1978

1979 to present

Month coding

Missouri implemented a monthly staggered registration system in 1949, when it introduced its first multi-year passenger plate. At first, serials were in an all-numeric format, with a block allocated to each month. When these were exhausted, a new format was introduced, featuring a one-letter prefix corresponding to the month. When new multi-year plates were introduced in 1955, the same all-numeric and one-letter serial formats were used, with some months then exhausting their one-letter serials and introducing a two-letter format (the first letter still corresponding to the month).

Two-letter serial formats were used exclusively from 1961 through 1978, including the twelve-year period in which Missouri reverted to the use of single-year plates (1967–78). An ABC 123 format was introduced in 1979 with the maroon "Show-Me State" plate, which was issued through 1996; months which exhausted their allocations subsequently used the A1B 234 and 1A2 34B formats.

Throughout this period, the first letter in the serial continued to correspond to the month. Increasing demand resulted in each of the months from April through September being assigned a second letter code in the mid-1960s. March and October were assigned second letters in the mid-1970s, and by the 1990s all twelve months were using two letters.

Month coding was discontinued with the introduction of the white, blue and green "Show-Me State" plate in 1997, before it was reintroduced in June 2008 with the introduction of the bluebird plate. Passenger plates used an AB1 C2D serial format, with the first letter corresponding to the month as from 1949 to 1996. This time, however, one letter was assigned for February, and two letters for each of the other eleven months, with the order of the letters strictly alphabetical. Hence, A and B were assigned for January, C for February, D and E for March, and so on up to Y and Z for December, with I, O and Q not used. This system was also used on light truck plates, which used a 1AB 234 serial format, the first letter corresponding to the month as on passenger plates.

When the Bicentennial plate was introduced in October 2018, passenger plates retained the AB1 C2D serial format, with each of the months that had been assigned two letters going over to its second letter (January going over from A to B, for instance), while February continued from where its serials on the bluebird plate had left off. Light truck plates continued to use the system but changed to a 1AB C23 serial format, the first letter corresponding to the month as before.

Non-passenger plates

Previous non-passenger plates

2008 base

1997 base

Optional types
Optional types on this base continue to be issued, likely until January 2009. Most, if not all, optional types on this base were available in personalized format and with certain non-passenger designations. Where applicable, this designation was printed in a small rectangle screened in the upper right corner of the plate.

References

External links
Missouri license plates, 1969–present

Missouri
Transportation in Missouri
Missouri transportation-related lists